David V. Aguilar is the former Deputy Commissioner of U.S. Customs and Border Protection. In this position, he oversaw more than 43,000 Federal Agents and Officers. As the nation's highest ranking Border Patrol Agent, Aguilar managed the nation's border control policing. Aguilar retired on Feb. 8, 2013.

Entered on duty in June 1978 at Laredo, Texas. He also served served as Patrol Agent in Charge of three different Border Patrol Stations in Texas from 1988 to August 1996. In January 1988 he was first promoted to Patrol Agent in Charge of the Dallas Border Patrol Station in Dallas, Texas. In 1992 he was promoted to the Rio Grande City Border Patrol Station in Rio Grande City, Texas. In July 1995 he was promoted to the Brownsville Border Patrol Station in Brownsville, Texas.

Aguilar is a supporter of "comprehensive immigration reform" but told his membership that he does not support "amnesty" or "legalization." He has been accused by a whistleblower of hindering internal investigations into Border Patrol corruption.

On March 31, 2013 David Aguilar retired after 35 years of government service with U.S. Customs and Border Protection and the United States Border Patrol. After his retirement, Aguilar partnered with Noah Kroloff, Dennis Burke, Mark Sullivan, John Kaites and Jerry Reinsdorf to found Global Security and Innovative Strategies.

Personal
Aguilar is a native of Edinburg, Texas and a 1974 graduate of Edinburg High School.

Mr. Aguilar received an associate degree in Accounting from Laredo Community College, attended Laredo State University (now Texas A&M International University) and University of Texas at Arlington. He is a graduate of the John F. Kennedy School of Government Harvard Senior Executive Fellows. He is a recipient of the 2005 President's Meritorious Excellence Award, and in 2008, Chief Aguilar was a recipient of the Presidential Rank Award.  
Chief Aguilar and his wife of 35 years, Bea, have three children and four grandchildren.

References

External links
 - CBP.gov - David V. Aguilar Commissioner, U.S. Customs and Border Protection
 - whitehouse.archives.gov David V. Aguilar Chief, Office of Border Patrol bio.
 

1955 births
Harvard Kennedy School alumni
Laredo Community College alumni
Living people
United States Border Patrol agents
United States Department of Homeland Security officials
People from Edinburg, Texas